Ravivarma (Kannada: ರವಿವರ್ಮ) is a 1992 Indian Kannada film, directed by Joe Simon and produced by Hemalatha Ramesh. The film stars Vishnuvardhan, Bhavya and Rupini in lead roles. The film had musical score by Upendra Kumar. The film was a romantic drama and a remake of the 1991 Tamil movie Bramma.

Cast
Vishnuvardhan as Ravivarma
Bhavya as Pavithra
Rupini as Jennifer
Mysore Lokesh
Sundar Krishna Urs
Ashok Rao as Dayanand
Sudheer
Sihi Kahi Chandru
Shanthamma
Ramamurthy
Jai Jagadish
Shivaram
Babu Antony as George

Soundtrack
All songs were composed by Upendra Kumar. The lyrics were written by Chi. Udaya Shankar and Shyamsundar Kulkarni. The soundtrack was successful upon release.

 "Nenapu Nooru Manadali" - Mano
 "Sogasu Kanna"  - S. Janaki
 "Naane Bere Nanna Style Bere" - Mano
 "Ododi Hoguva"- Mano, S. Janaki
 "Ravivarma Baredanta" - Mano, S. Janaki

References

External links
 

1992 films
1990s Kannada-language films
Films scored by Upendra Kumar
Kannada remakes of Tamil films